Untitled #96 is a color photograph made by American visual artist Cindy Sherman in 1981. It is known as part of her Centerfold series of 12 pictures. On 11 May 2011, a print was auctioned for US$3.89 million, the highest price paid for a photographic print at that time, though the price has since been surpassed. Another print was sold by $2,882,500 at Christie's New York, at 8 May 2012.

Description
The photograph depicts the artist portraying a young teenager girl with short blonde hair, lying in linoleum floor, wearing an orange sweater and a short skirt, as she clutches the scrap of a newspaper. Cindy Sherman explained about the composition: "I was thinking of a young girl who may have been cleaning the kitchen for her mother and who ripped something out of the newspaper, something asking 'Are you lonely?' or 'Do you want to be friends?' or 'Do you want to go on a vacation?' She's cleaning the floor, she rips this out and she's thinking about it".

Public collections
There are prints of the photograph at the Museum of Modern Art, in New York, The Art Institute of Chicago, and the Museum Boijmans van Beuningen, in Rotterdam.

See also
 List of most expensive photographs

References

Color photographs
1981 works
1981 in art
Photographs by Cindy Sherman
1980s photographs
Photographs of the Art Institute of Chicago
Photographs of the Museum of Modern Art (New York City)